This is a complete list of members of the United States House of Representatives during the 117th United States Congress, which runs from January 3, 2021, through January 3, 2023, ordered by seniority.

House seniority list

Non-voting delegates

See also
 List of current members of the United States House of Representatives
 List of U.S. congressional districts
 List of United States senators in the 117th Congress by seniority
 Seniority in the United States House of Representatives

References

Seniority
117